Bani Hammad is a sub-district located in the Al-Mawasit District, Taiz Governorate, Yemen. Bani Hammad had a population of 21,987 according to the 2004 census.

Villages
 Al-Ḥaqibah
 Bani Hasan Raʿiah
 Uzlat al-Jibal
 Al-Bahmah
 Bani Sinan
 Yafiq
 Bani Hasan Wa Bani Wagih
 Al-Maʿinah
 Bani Samiʿa
 Bani Afif
 Al-Minam
 Al-Da'bah
 Al-ʿAjilah

References

Sub-districts in Al-Mawasit District